Riverbend Park is a  along the Deschutes River, near Bend, Oregon's Old Mill District, in the United States. Yakaya is installed in the park.

References

Parks in Bend, Oregon